Don or Donald Clark may refer to:

Sports
Donald Clark (cricketer) (1914–1994), Australian cricketer who played for Tasmania
Don Clark (footballer) (1917–2014), English association football player
Don Clark (American football) (1923–1989), American football player and coach, head football coach at the University of Southern California
Don Clark (Canadian football) (born 1936), running back in the Canadian Football League

Other
Don Clark (psychologist) (born 1930), clinical psychologist who has specialized in group and individual work with gay people
Donald C. Clark Sr. (born 1931), American business executive
Don Clark (musician) (born 1975), guitarist of Christian metal band Demon Hunter

See also
 Don Clarke (1933–2002), rugby union player
 Don R. Clarke (born 1945), general authority of the Church of Jesus Christ of Latter-day Saints
 Donald Clarke (disambiguation)